Bufoceratias wedli is a deepsea anglerfish found in the mesopelagic to bathypelagic regions of the ocean, ranging from a depth of 300 to 1750 m. It is a double angler with two lures on its back, the anterior lure being the smaller.

Taxonomy
The species was previously classified as Phrynichthys wedli, then Paroneirodes wedli, before being renamed shortly after as Bufoceratias wedli.

External links
 Australian museum: B. wedli

Diceratiidae
Fish described in 1926
Taxa named by Viktor Pietschmann